Three dimensional (3D) bioprinting is the utilization of 3D printing–like techniques to combine cells, growth factors, and/or biomaterials to fabricate biomedical parts, often with the aim of imitating natural tissue characteristics. Generally, 3D bioprinting can utilize a layer-by-layer method to deposit materials known as bio-inks to create tissue-like structures that are later used in various medical and tissue engineering fields. 3D bioprinting covers a broad range of bioprinting techniques and biomaterials. Currently, bioprinting can be used to print tissue and organ models to help research drugs and potential treatments. Nonetheless, translation of bioprinted living cellular constructs into clinical application is met with several issues due to the complexity and cell number needed to create functional organs. However, innovations span from bioprinting of extracellular matrix to mixing cells with hydrogels deposited layer by layer to produce the desired tissue. In addition, 3D bioprinting has begun to incorporate the printing of scaffolds. These scaffolds can be used to regenerate joints and ligaments.

Process

3D bioprinting generally follows three steps, pre-bioprinting, bioprinting, and post-bioprinting.

Pre-bioprinting 
Pre-bioprinting is the process of creating a model that the printer will later create and choosing the materials that will be used. One of the first steps is to obtain a biopsy of the organ. Common technologies used for bioprinting are computed tomography (CT) and magnetic resonance imaging (MRI). To print with a layer-by-layer approach, tomographic reconstruction is done on the images. The now-2D images are then sent to the printer to be made. Once the image is created, certain cells are isolated and multiplied. These cells are then mixed with a special liquefied material that provides oxygen and other nutrients to keep them alive. In some processes, the cells are encapsulated in cellular spheroids 500μm in diameter. This aggregation of cells does not require a scaffold, and are required for placing in the tubular-like tissue fusion for processes such as extrusion.

Bioprinting 
In the second step, the liquid mixture of cells, matrix, and nutrients known as bioinks are placed in a printer cartridge and deposited using the patients' medical scans. When a bioprinted pre-tissue is transferred to an incubator, this cell-based pre-tissue matures into a tissue.

3D  bioprinting for fabricating biological constructs typically involves dispensing cells onto a biocompatible scaffold using a successive layer-by-layer approach to generate tissue-like three-dimensional structures. Artificial organs such as livers and kidneys made by 3D bioprinting have been shown to lack crucial elements that affect the body such as working blood vessels, tubules for collecting urine, and the growth of billions of cells required for these organs. Without these components the body has no way to get the essential nutrients and oxygen deep within their interiors. Given that every tissue in the body is naturally composed of different cell types, many technologies for printing these cells vary in their ability to ensure stability and viability of the cells during the manufacturing process. Some of the methods that are used for 3D bioprinting of cells are photolithography, magnetic 3D bioprinting, stereolithography, and direct cell extrusion.

Post-bioprinting 
The post-bioprinting process is necessary to create a stable structure from the biological material. If this process is not well-maintained, the mechanical integrity and function of the 3D printed object is at risk. To maintain the object, both mechanical and chemical stimulations are needed. These stimulations send signals to the cells to control the remodeling and growth of tissues. In addition, in recent development, bioreactor technologies have allowed the rapid maturation of tissues, vascularization of tissues and the ability to survive transplants.

Bioreactors work in either providing convective nutrient transport, creating microgravity environments, changing the pressure causing solution to flow through the cells, or adding compression for dynamic or static loading. Each type of bioreactor is ideal for different types of tissue, for example compression bioreactors are ideal for cartilage tissue.

Bioprinting approach 
Researchers in the field have developed approaches to produce living organs that are constructed with the appropriate biological and mechanical properties. 3D bioprinting is based on three main approaches: Biomimicry, autonomous self-assembly and mini-tissue building blocks.

Biomimicry
The first approach of bioprinting is called biomimicry. The main goal of this approach is to create fabricated structures that are identical to the natural structure that are found in the tissues and organs in the human body. Biomimicry requires duplication of the shape, framework, and the microenvironment of the organs and tissues. The application of biomimicry in bioprinting involves creating both identical cellular and extracellular parts of organs. For this approach to be successful, the tissues must be replicated on a micro scale. Therefore, it is necessary to understand the microenvironment, the nature of the biological forces in this microenvironment, the precise organization of functional and supporting cell types, solubility factors, and the composition of extracellular matrix.

Autonomous self-assembly
The second approach of bioprinting is autonomous self-assembly. This approach relies on the physical process of embryonic organ development as a model to replicate the tissues of interest. When cells are in their early development, they create their own extracellular matrix building block, the proper cell signaling, and independent arrangement and patterning to provide the required biological functions and micro-architecture. Autonomous self-assembly demands specific information about the developmental techniques of the tissues and organs of the embryo. There is a "scaffold-free" model that uses self-assembling spheroids that subjects to fusion and cell arrangement to resemble evolving tissues. Autonomous self-assembly depends on the cell as the fundamental driver of histogenesis, guiding the building blocks, structural and functional properties of these tissues. It demands a deeper understanding of how embryonic tissues mechanisms develop as well as the microenvironment surrounded to create the bioprinted tissues.

Mini-tissue
The third approach of bioprinting is a combination of both the biomimicry and self-assembly approaches, which is called mini tissues. Organs and tissues are built from very small functional components. Mini-tissue approach takes these small pieces and manufacture and arrange them into larger framework.

Printers 

Akin to ordinary ink printers, bioprinters have three major components to them. These are the hardware used, the type of bio-ink, and the material it is printed on (biomaterials).
"Bio-ink is a material made from living cells that behaves much like a liquid, allowing people to 'print' it in order to create the desired shape. To make bio-ink, scientists create a slurry of cells that can be loaded into a cartridge and inserted into a specially designed printer, along with another cartridge containing a gel known as bio-paper."
In bioprinting, there are three major types of printers that have been used. These are inkjet, laser-assisted, and extrusion printers. Inkjet printers are mainly used in bioprinting for fast and large-scale products. One type of inkjet printer, called drop-on-demand inkjet printer, prints materials in exact amounts, minimizing cost and waste. Printers that utilize lasers provide high-resolution printing; however, these printers are often expensive. Extrusion printers print cells layer-by-layer, just like 3D printing to create 3D constructs. In addition to just cells, extrusion printers may also use hydrogels infused with cells.

Extrusion-Based Methods 
Extrusion-based printing is a very common technique within the field of 3D printing which entails extruding, or forcing, a continuous stream of melted solid material or viscous liquid through a sort of orifice, often a nozzle or syringe. When it comes to extrusion based bioprinting, there are three main types of extrusion. These are pneumatic driven, piston driven, and screw driven. Each extrusion method has their own advantages and disadvantages. Pneumatic extrusion uses pressurized air to force liquid bioink through a depositing agent. The air used to move the bioink must be free of contaminants. Air filters are commonly used to sterilize the air before it is used. Piston driven extrusion utilizes a piston connected to a guide screw. The linear motion of the piston squeezes material out of the nozzle. Screw driven extrusion uses an auger screw to extrude material. The rotational motion forces the material down and out of the nozzle. Screw driven devices allow for the use of higher viscosity materials and provide more volumetric control. Once printed, many materials require a crosslinking step to achieve the desired mechanical properties for the construct, which can be achieved for example with the treatment of chemical agents or photo-crosslinkers.

Direct extrusion is one of the most common extrusion-based bioprinting techniques, wherein the pressurized force directs the bioink to flow out of the nozzle, and directly print the scaffold without any necessary casting. The bioink itself for this approach can be a blend of polymer hydrogels, naturally derived materials such as collagen, and live cells suspended in the solution. In this manner, scaffolds can be cultured post-print and without the need for further treatment for cellular seeding. Some focus in the use of direct printing techniques is based upon the use of coaxial nozzle assemblies, or coaxial extrusion. The coaxial nozzle setup enables the simultaneous extrusion of multiple material bioinks, capable of making multi-layered scaffolds in a single extrusion step.  The development of tubular structures has found the layered extrusion achieved via these techniques desirable for the radial variability in material characterization that it can offer, as the coaxial nozzle provides an inner and outer tube for bioink flow. Indirect extrusion techniques for bioprinting rather require the printing of a base material of cell-laden hydrogels, but unlike direct extrusion contains a sacrificial hydrogel that can be trivially removed post-printing through thermal or chemical extraction. The remaining resin solidifies and becomes the desired 3D-printed construct.

Other Printing Methods 
Droplet-based bioprinting is a technique in which the bioink blend of cells and/or hydrogels are placed in droplets in precise positions. Most common amongst this approach are thermal and piezoelectric-drop-on-demand techniques. Thermal technologies use short duration signals to heat the bioink, inducing the formation of small bubbles which are ejected. Piezoelectric bioprinting has short duration current rather applied to a piezoelectric actuator, which induces a mechanical vibration capable of ejecting a small globule of bioink through the nozzle. A significant aspect of the study of droplet-based approaches to bioprinting is accounting for mechanical and thermal stress cells within the bioink experience near the nozzle-tip as they are extruded.

Laser-based bioprinting can be split into two major classes: those based on cell transfer technologies or photo-polymerization. In cell transfer laser printing, a laser stimulates the interface between energy-absorbing material (e.g. gold, titanium, etc.) and the bioink, which contains a sacrificial material. This sacrificial ‘donor layer’ vaporizes under the laser’s irradiation, forming a bubble from the bioink layer which gets deposited from a jet. Photo-polymerization techniques rather use photoinitiated reactions to solidify the ink, moving the beam path of a laser to induce the formation of a desired construct. Certain laser frequencies paired with photopolymerization reactions can be carried out without damaging cells in the material.

Applications

Transplantable organs and organs for research
There are many applications for 3D bioprinting in the medical field. An infant patient with a rare respiratory disease known as tracheobronchomalacia (TBM) was given a tracheal splint that was created with 3D printing. 3D bioprinting can be used to reconstruct tissue from various regions of the body. Patients with end-stage bladder disease can be treated by using engineered bladder tissues to rebuild the damaged organ. This technology can also potentially be applied to bone, skin, cartilage and muscle tissue. Though one long-term goal of 3D bioprinting technology is to reconstruct an entire organ, there has been little success in printing fully functional organs. Unlike implantable stents, organs have complex shapes and are significantly harder to bioprint. A bioprinted heart, for example, must not only meet structural requirements, but also vascularization, mechanical load, and electrical signal propagation requirements. Israeli researchers constructed a rabbit-sized heart out of human cells in 2019.

In 2022, first success of a clinical trial for a 3D bioprinted transplant that is made from the patient's own cells, an external ear to treat microtia, was reported.

Cultured meat

Bioprinting can also be used for cultured meat. In 2021, a steak-like cultured meat, composed of three types of bovine cell fibers was produced. The Wagyu-like beef has a structure similar to original meat.

Impact
3D bioprinting contributes to significant advances in the medical field of tissue engineering by allowing for research to be done on innovative materials called biomaterials. Biomaterials are the materials adapted and used for printing three-dimensional objects. Some of the most notable bioengineered substances are usually stronger than the average bodily materials, including soft tissue and bone. These constituents can act as future substitutes, even improvements, for the original body materials. Alginate, for example, is an anionic polymer with many biomedical implications including feasibility, strong biocompatibility, low toxicity, and stronger structural ability in comparison to some of the body's structural material. Synthetic hydrogels are also commonplace, including PV-based gels. The combination of acid with a UV-initiated PV-based cross-linker has been evaluated by the Wake Forest Institute of Medicine and determined to be a suitable biomaterial. Engineers are also exploring other options such as printing micro-channels that can maximize the diffusion of nutrients and oxygen from neighboring tissues. In addition, the Defense Threat Reduction Agency aims to print mini organs such as hearts, livers, and lungs as the potential to test new drugs more accurately and perhaps eliminate the need for testing in animals.

See also 

 3D printing § Bio-printing
 Biofabrication
 Cultured meat
 Ethics of bioprinting
 Magnetic 3D bioprinting
 Microgravity bioprinting
 Regenerative medicine

References

Further reading 

 
 
 

Bioprinting
Biomaterials
Tissue engineering
Synthetic biology
Self-replication